Fraser Colson (born 19 March 1990) is a New Zealand cricketer who plays for Wellington. He made his first-class debut on 7 November 2013 in the 2013–14 Plunket Shield. He made his Twenty20 debut on 21 December 2019, for Wellington in the 2019–20 Super Smash.

In June 2020, he was offered a contract by Wellington ahead of the 2020–21 domestic cricket season.

References

External links
 

1990 births
Living people
New Zealand cricketers
Wellington cricketers
Cricketers from Lower Hutt